Uruguayan singer Natalia Oreiro has embarked on seven concert tours. She has also performed live at various award ceremonies and television shows. In 2000 she embarked on her debut headlining concert tour, Tu Veneno Tour, which visited South America, North America, Europe and Asia due to the huge success of the telenovela Muňeca Brava (Wild Angel) around the world. The tour, which began in 2000 but took place throughout most of 2001 and early 2002, was Natalia's biggest and most successful international tour to date.

Oreiro's next tour was named Tourmalina by combining the title of her third album Turmalina and the word "tour". It took place between September and November 2003 and the concerts took place in only two countries: Argentina and Russia after declining the original idea of concerts in Hungary and Israel.

Concert tours

Festival concert

Performances on television shows and specials

Performances at award shows

References 

Oreiro, Natalia